The Bassett Unified School District  is a California public unified school district based in the La Puente Valley of the eastern region of the San Gabriel Valley in Los Angeles County, California, United States.

Governance
The district is governed by a five-member Board of Education. The incumbent members of the Board of Education are Armando Barajas (President), Paul Solano (Vice President), Patrice Stanzione (Clerk), Dolores Rivera, and Dena Florez. The Board has one non-voting student member from the district's high school who represents the district's whole student body.

The Board meets monthly in accordance with California Law. Members of the board are elected by the qualified voters of the district for a term of four years. There are no imposed term limits on board membership. Members of the board receive a no-obligation salary below $300. The district is a member of many other educational/ governmental organizations throughout the region/ state/ nation and regularly appoints Board members as delegates to those organizations.

Administration
The board has the duties of managing the district schools, funds and personnel and as well as the power to hire/ fire said personnel, ordering elections to fill any vacancy (or appoint) and to name a district Superintendent of Schools and other high ranking administrators who form his/ her Cabinet. 
The former Deputy Superintendent was Dr. Antoine Hawkins. These senior executive administrative officers make up the core Superintendents Cabinet.

Taxes and employment
The district is currently assessing or levying property taxes upon all real property in the district pursuant to three obligation bonds approved by district voters in recent years. These obligation bonds are consistent with California law and all funds collected are for local usage and supervised by a citizen's bond oversight committee of seven members. There are two of such committees: a Measure E committee (currently composed of four persons and has been renewed once in consequence of Measure E being re approved) and a Measure 'V' committee (yet to be called). The district has a Personnel Commission of three persons, with Mr. John Muraki as its director. The commission is tasked with providing employment related recommendations to the district Superintendent who presents to the Board of Education for their consideration the Commission's recommendations.

Associations
The Bassett Teachers Association (B.T.A.) and the California School Employees Association (C.S.E.A.) are the two major associations in the district.

School sites
The district has one comprehensive senior high school (9–12), a continuation high school (10–12), an adult education program, a child-development program, three elementary schools (K–5), one academy (K–8) and a middle school (6–8) (which is also a California Distinguished school). The district also owns two other campuses for program usage, Erwin and Flanner. The district's first campus was Bassett Elementary which was closed down and is now part of the lands composing a private community on the corner of Temple and Vineland avenues. It was adjacent to Bassett Park, operated by Los Angeles County. Nearby religious/ private high school Bishop Amat Memorial High School is not operated by the district but is under the authority of the Roman Catholic Archdiocese of Los Angeles.

History
The district itself, its first school and its only high school are named after Mr. Oscar T. Bassett of El Paso, Texas. It was part of Bassett Township in the late 19th century belonging to John Rowland and William H. Workman. Bassett Township] was part of Rancho La Puente, a land grant from the then Alta California Governor Pio Pico. This rancho was composed of many farms, fields and groves; predominantly walnuts, citruses, avocados, grapes, etc. The land was sold to many individuals creating the neighboring cities around the area. The district was supervised by a three-member Board of Trustees and had no more than three schools. By the 1960s, Bassett Unified School District became a larger academic entity, however for safety reasons some of the first buildings were destroyed and the property sold. By the 1980s, all campuses/ school sites there today were of existence. In 1998, the small district celebrated its Centennial. The district is located in the unincorporated community of Bassett, and in portions of the unincorporated communities of West Puente Valley, and Avocado Heights and portions of the cities of La Puente, Baldwin Park, West Covina and the City of Industry.

Measure V
Bassett USD Schools Safety, College/Career Readiness Measure V was on the November 4, 2014 election ballot for voters in the Bassett Unified School District in Los Angeles county, California. A 55 percent supermajority vote was required for the approval of this measure.  It was approved by 62.42%.

Measure V authorized the district to increase its debt by $30 million through issuing general obligation bonds in that amount to fund major renovations, repairs and upgrades to classrooms and schools throughout the district. Homeowners would be taxed $60 per $100,000 of assessed property value annually.

The previous administration under the leadership of Alex Rojas superintendent recognized the need to redesign the district's classrooms and technology infrastructure.  Measure V laid the foundation for technology innovation in Bassett Unified School District, which is now recognized for its use of technology and has launched a successful podcast called TOSAs Talking Tech and a 1:1 student device initiative.

External links
 Official BUSD Website

Media
 Graduation Rates
 Special Education
 Special Education
 Technology
 Technology
 Test Scores
 Film Academy
 Technology Bond

La Puente, California
City of Industry, California
School districts in Los Angeles County, California
School districts established in 1898
1898 establishments in California